The 2014 Mississippi State Bulldogs football team represented Mississippi State University in the 2014 NCAA Division I FBS football season. The team was coached by Dan Mullen, who was in his sixth season with Mississippi State. The Bulldogs played their home games at the newly expanded and renovated Davis Wade Stadium in Starkville, Mississippi and competed in the Western Division of the Southeastern Conference (SEC).

The 2014 season was one of the most successful seasons in Mississippi State's 110-year football history. In mid-October, they shot to #1 in the polls for the first time in school history, and the highest that any FBS team in Mississippi had been ranked at that late date in the season in half a century.  They ultimately finished 10–3, the second 10-win regular season in school history. They netted a berth in the Orange Bowl, the second major-bowl appearance in school history, where they were defeated by Georgia Tech.

Before the season

Previous season
The 2013 Mississippi State Bulldogs football team finished 7–6, defeating Rice in the Liberty Bowl. The Bulldogs' conference victories included a narrow win over Kentucky, an overtime road win at Arkansas, and an overtime thriller over rival Ole Miss in the Egg Bowl.

It was the Bulldogs' fourth straight bowl season, the first time in school history a team had accomplished this feat. The 2013 Bulldogs averaged 434 yards per game on offensive, the highest output in school history.

Departing players

Key losses for the Bulldogs included:
Denico Autry, starting defensive end and current member of the Tennessee Titans
Gabe Jackson, offensive guard who was selected by the Raiders in the third round of the 2014 NFL Draft
LaDarius Perkins, starting running back and fifth on the Bulldogs' career leaderboard with 2,554 rushing yards
Tyler Russell, whose 5,441 passing yards ranked third in school history at the time
Deontae Skinner, starting linebacker and current member of the New York Giants
Nickoe Whitley, a four-year starter at safety with 15 career interceptions and 2 key late-game forced fumbles to seal games in 2013

Preseason prognostication
The Bulldogs were picked to finish 5th in the SEC West by a vote of 229 media writers at the 2014 SEC Media Days, while Athlon Sports and NBC Sports both picked the Bulldogs to come in sixth.

Roster and staff

Schedule

Schedule Source:

‡ New Davis Wade Stadium Attendance Record

Game summaries

Southern Miss

 Source:

*Mississippi State won the games on the field in 1975 and 1976, but were later forced to forfeit the games by the NCAA due to an NCAA rules violation in which offensive lineman Larry Gillard received a 33 percent discount at an Okolona, Mississippi clothing store.

UAB

 Source:

South Alabama

 Source:

LSU

 Source:

Texas A&M

 Source:

Auburn

 Source:

Kentucky

 Source:

Arkansas

 Source:

Tennessee–Martin

 Source:

Alabama

 Source:

Vanderbilt

 Source:

Mississippi

 Source:

Georgia Tech (Orange Bowl)

 Source:

Rankings

Following MSU's win over Auburn, the team was ranked Number 1 in the AP Poll for the first time in the program's history. That also marked "the fastest [rise to the top] in AP Top 25 history." The previous mark was six weeks by Ohio State in 1954.  The Bulldogs also became the first ever team to be ranked number 1 in the newly created College Football Playoff Poll when the initial poll was released on October 28, 2014.

References

Mississippi State Bulldogs football seasons
Mississippi State
Mississippi State Bulldogs f